This is a list of films which have placed number one at the weekend box office in Canada during 2010.

Weekend gross list

Highest-grossing films in Canada

See also
List of Canadian films - Canadian films by year

References

External links

2010
Canada
2010 in Canadian cinema